The Courtois-Suffit Lescop CSL C1 was a French biplane fighter aircraft built in the final months of World War I.

Specifications (variant specified)

References

Biplanes
1910s French fighter aircraft
Single-engined tractor aircraft
Aircraft first flown in 1918